A balairung is a village hall of the Minangkabau people of West Sumatra, Indonesia.

Etymology

The term  has been incorporated into the Indonesian language in general. In modern times, any kind of hall was named , e.g., the  building of the University of Indonesia, which is the main hall of the university and the largest building in the campus.

Architecture 

Consequently, a  lacks panels for the door and shutters for the windows. Many  do not have a wall at all.

This raised platform is where the  should be seated.

Function
A  is used to hold meetings which resolve disputes or give punishment to a person. The  (a pavilion to prepare) is a platform where a mutual consultation is held before implementing new laws in the village.

A  can only be built in a village that has already received the  status (administrative village). Therefore, the balairung acts as a kind of town hall for the village.

See also 

 Rumah gadang
 Architecture of Sumatra
 Architecture of Indonesia

References

Citations

Cited works  

Rumah adat
Sumatra
Architecture in Indonesia